The Republican Party of the Social Order (PROS) was a political party in Brazil, founded in 2010, and officially recognized in 2013.

In the 2018 Brazilian general election, PROS allied with the Workers Party and the Communist Party of Brazil to support the Presidential pre-candidacy of former President Luiz Inácio Lula da Silva and former Mayor of São Paulo Fernando Haddad. After Lula was declared ineligible to contest the election, PROS supported Haddad and his running mate Manuela d'Ávila as part of the alliance "The People Happy Again," remaining allied with PT and PCdoB.

In the 2022 Brazilian general election, PROS allied with the Brazil of Hope coalition, with the main members being Workers Party, the Communist Party of Brazil, PSOL REDE Federation, and the Brazilian Socialist Party to support the pre-candidacy of former President Luiz Inácio Lula da Silva and former Governor of Sao Paulo Geraldo Alckmin as part of the alliance "Let's go together for Brazil". 

Following the elections, the party announced plans to merge with Solidarity. The Superior Electoral Court approved the merger on February 14, 2023.

Electoral results

Presidential elections

Legislative elections

References

2010 establishments in Brazil
Christian political parties
Nationalist parties in Brazil
Political parties established in 2010
Political parties in Brazil